is a Fukui Railway Fukubu Line railway station located in the city of  Fukui, Fukui, Japan.

Lines

Station layout
The station consists of one ground-level island platform connected to the log-cabin station building by a level crossing. The station is staffed from 7:05 to 19:05.

Adjacent stations

History
The station opened on July 26, 1925. The station building was rebuilt in April 1992.

Surrounding area
The area is a mix of homes, offices, and warehouses.
Other facilities nearby include Fukui Prefectural Asuwa High School, Fukui Municipal Asuwa Junior High School, Fukui Municipal Asōzu Elementary School, and the Fukui branch of the Light Motor Vehicle Inspection Organization.

See also
 List of railway stations in Japan

External links

  

Railway stations in Fukui Prefecture
Railway stations in Japan opened in 1925
Fukui Railway Fukubu Line
Fukui (city)